The 2018 WNBL Finals was the postseason tournament of the WNBL's 2017–18 season.

Standings

Bracket

Finals

Semi-finals

(1) Perth Lynx vs. (4) Melbourne Boomers

(2) Sydney Uni Flames vs. (3) Townsville Fire

Grand Final

(3) Townsville Fire vs. (4) Melbourne Boomers

Rosters

References 

Women's National Basketball League Finals
Finals